is a Japanese fashion model. She is represented with Neutral Management.

Saegusa's brother is businessman Yasuaki Miyashita.

Biography
Saegusa was born in Anamizu, Hōsu District, Ishikawa. During middle school, she won sixteen rounds in the table tennis national tournament. While going to Ishikawa Prefectural Wajima High School, Saegusa's table tennis recommendation admission was declined. She later graduated from Aoyama Gakuin Women's Junior College. Saegusa's hobby is golf in which she won the best score of 83 in the regular tee and 78 in the ladies tee.

Filmography

Advertisements

Advertising

Magazines
Regular

Others

Books

Magazine serialisations

Events, fashion shows

TV series

Others

References

External links
 

Japanese female models
1987 births
Living people
People from Ishikawa Prefecture
Models from Ishikawa Prefecture